Kuringgai (also spelled Ku-ring-gai, Kuring-gai, Guringai, Kuriggai) is an ethnonym referring to an  Indigenous Australian peoples occupying the territory between the southern borders of the Gamilaraay and the area around Sydney, and an historical people with its own distinctive language, located in part of that territory.

Origins of the ethnonym
In 1892, ethnologist John Fraser edited and republished the work of Lancelot Edward Threlkeld on the language of the Awabakal people, An Australian Grammar, with lengthy additions. In his "Map of New South Wales as occupied by the native tribes" and text accompanying it, he deploys the term Kuringgai to refer to the people inhabiting a large stretch of the central coastline of New South Wales. He regarded the language described by Threlkeld as a dialect of a larger language, variations of which were spoken by many other tribes in New South Wales, and, in order to define this perceived language block he coined the word Kurriggai/Kuringgai:
we have now come to know that this dialect was essentially the same as that spoken by the sub-tribes occupying the land where Sydney now stands, and that they all formed parts of one great tribe, the Kuriggai.
Fraser lists a number of tribes to the north of his assumed Kuriggai language family: the Gamilaraay and their sub-tribes, the Ualarai and Weilwan. In the text accompanying his map, he states:
The next great tribe is the Kuringgai on the sea coast. Their taurai (hunting ground or territory) is known to extend north to the Macleay River, and I found that southwards it reached the Hawkesbury. then after, by examining the remains of the language of the natives about Sydney and southwards, and by other tests, I assured myself that the country thereabout was occupied by sub-tribes of the Kurringgai.

Norman Tindale, in his 1974 classic survey of all known Australian tribes, was dismissive of Fraser's conjecture as "poor" in details, and "unquestionably the most inaccurate and garbled account ever published about the aborigines. Many of his tribal names were pure artifacts", each created to subsume under an invented label several different tribal identities: thus his fantasy of a Paikalyung crushed together 10 tribal units; his Yunggai nation throws together the Anēwan, Jukambal and the Kwiambal; his Wachigaru dissolves into one fictional unity the Banbai, Gumbaynggirr, Ngaku and some of the
Dunghutti. Even his acknowledgement of the Ualarai actually sweeps up 5 distinct aboriginal societies. Under his heading for the Awabakal, he writes:
the Awabakal are the central one of a series of tribes to which the arbitrary term Kuringgai has been applied by Fraser.

Where Fraser discerned one "nation", Tindale defined a conglomeration of distinct tribes such as the Tharawal, Eora, Dharuk, Darkinjang, Awabakal, Worimi, Wonnarua, Birpai and Ngamba.

Arthur Capell, writing four years earlier, thought to the contrary that Kuringgai/Guriŋgai denoted some substantive historical reality, and was an appropriate name for the language spoken on the north side of Port Jackson northwards at least as far as Tuggerah Lakes. He concluded under the heading ''Karee/Kuringgai' that the reference is to:-
the language of the Pittwater people, and included the well-known Cammeraygal on the extreme south, along the northern shores of Port Jackson, and stretched as far north at least as Broken Bay. This is the basis for the statement above that the "Sydney" language did not cross Port Jackson

Val Attenbrow dismissed Capell's claim for an independent Guriŋgai, while Amanda Lissarrague and Jim Wafer reanalyzed the material and concluded the word denoted the "Hunter River-Lake Macquarie language", otherwise known as Awabakal.

Geoff Ford in his thesis, "Darkiñung recognition : an analysis of the historiography for the Aborigines from the Hawkesbury-Hunter Ranges to the Northwest of Sydney (2010)" Chapters 8 & 9 in particular investigates the work of Threlkeld, Fraser, Matthews and others and determined that the Kuringgai were actually the "Wannungine". These were the same people that Thelkeld worked with and Fraser identified as Awabakal.

Notable people
 Bungaree, a Broken Bay clan member who was selected by Governor Lachlan Macquarie to be "king" of the Sydney "blacks". He was the first person to be referred to as an Australian. His direct descendants refer to themselves as GuriNgai people.

Today
The name invented by John Fraser still reverberates in a number of placenames and institutions in New South Wales.
 Electoral district of Ku-ring-gai
 Hornsby Ku-ring-gai Hospital
 Ku-ring-gai Chase National Park
 Ku-ring-gai High School
 Ku-ring-gai Council
 Mount Ku-ring-gai
 Kuring-gai College of Advanced Education, subsumed in 1989 as part of the University of Technology, Sydney

Notes

Citations

Sources

Further reading

Aboriginal peoples of New South Wales